Hindu Vidya Peeth (HVP) is a private secondary school run by the Hindu Charitable Society in Sonepat, Haryana, India. It was established in 1982.  It is a co-educational school with around 4,000 students spread across its campus at Sonepat. HVP is affiliated with the Central Board of Secondary Education (CBSE).

History
Hindu Vidya Peeth was set up in 1982 by The Sonepat Hindu Educational and  Charitable society, Sonepat (Regd.) a large organization and registered society founded in 1914, the society runs 15 institutions.

Campus
The school's facilities include two libraries that house 10,000 books in the senior library and 5,000 books in the junior library; a reading room; an audio-visual hall; an air-conditioned Seminar Hall, and two canteens. The school has laboratories for computing, Physics, Chemistry, Biology, Language and Mathematics.
The Sports Complex has facilities for volleyball, cricket, football, basketball, hockey, athletics, table tennis, and badminton.

References 

Private schools in Haryana
High schools and secondary schools in Haryana